The Gloucestershire Championships also known as the Gloucestershire Lawn Tennis Championships was a combined men's and women's clay court then later grass court combined men's and women's tennis tournament founded in 1882 as the Gloucestershire Lawn Tennis Tournament. The tournament was first held in Cheltenham, Gloucestershire, England, but alternated venues throughout its run which ended in 1931.

History
In 1882 the Gloucestershire Lawn Tennis Tournament was first held at Montpellier gardens, Cheltenham, Gloucestershire, England.  In 1897 this tournaments name was changed to the Gloucestershire Lawn Tennis Association Tournament following the creation of Gloucestershire Lawn Tennis Association. and the tournament was moved to Clifton, Bristol as a replacement event for the Bristol and Clifton Open which was discontinued. In 1904 the tournament names was altered to the Gloucestershire Lawn Tennis Championships.

Event name
 Gloucestershire Lawn Tennis Tournament (1882-1896)
 Gloucestershire Lawn Tennis Association Tournament (1897-1903)
 Gloucestershire Lawn Tennis Championships  (1904-1920)
 Gloucestershire Championships (1921-1931)

See also
 East Gloucestershire Championships

References

Defunct tennis tournaments in the United Kingdom
Clay court tennis tournaments
Grass court tennis tournaments